Anton Vadimovich Belyaev (born September 18, 1979, in Magadan) is a Russian musician, leader and front-man of music band Therr Maitz. He is also a sound producer, composer, and was a semifinalist of the Russian version of «The Voice» TV show.

Family 

His mother, Alfina Sergeevna Belyaeva, was  born on January 30, 1949, in Kazakhstan. 
His father, Vadim Borisovich Belyaev, was born on December 4, 1946, in Saratov (Russia).
In 1962, Anton’s parents moved from Kazakhstan to Magadan (Russia).

In 1968 they got married. On November 21, 1968, they gave birth to an elder daughter, Lilia. She graduated from Khabarovsk Institute of Culture as a technical literature librarian (bibliographer).

In 2012 Anton Belyaev got married. His wife’s name is Yulia Aleksandrovna Belyaeva, who was born in Szekesfehervar, Hungarian People’s Republic, to a military family. Yulia graduated from the Journalism Department of Moscow State University. She started her career at newspaper “Evening Moscow”, later she worked as a TV hostess and correspondent of Russian channels: Channel One Russia, MTV, Muz-TV, Russian Music Box, DTV, conducted videos for Mainpeople.ru. Currently Yulia is a director of Therr Maitz

On 22 May 2017 Anton Belyaev and Yulia Belyaeva gave birth to a son Semyon.

Art 
Belyaev’s musical skills became obvious very early. He used kitchenware as drums. In 1984, 5-year-old Anton entered Music school №1 in Magadan, Russia. He wanted to study drums but was too young for that. So, he went to piano classes. He used to get sick very often, but always participated in music contests and was awarded several times.

When Anton was 13, he met Evgeny Chernonog and started to study at his jazz studio. At age 14 he played jazz compositions with famous jazz musicians in Magadan. At age 16 Anton played in youth jazz orchestra; recorded famous jazz standards with Evgeny Chernonog on two pianos.

When Anton was 17, his mother insisted on moving to Khabarovsk (Russia), where he entered Khabarovsk State Institute of Art and Culture (pop-jazz department). In October, 1998 Anton Belyaev started to work as a musician in various Khabarovsk clubs. In 2004 Anton became the art-director of the club “Rus”, where he invited musicians Dmitry Pavlov (guitar), Maksim Bondarenko (bass), Konstantin Drobyt’ko (trumpet), and Evgeny Kozhin (drums). Presence of technical equipment at the club allowed Anton to start creating music, which formed the basis of Therr Maitz.

In 2006, Anton moved to Moscow. There, he worked as an arranger for four years. During this time, he worked with Tamara Gverdtsiteli, Igor Grigoriev, Maksim Pokrovsky, Polina Gagarina.

In 2013, Anton participated in the second season of the Russian “The Voice”. He was chosen by all four mentors of the show. Anton chose Leonid Agutin, a famous Russian singer, who decided to expel the participant after the second tour. However, Anton was saved by Russian ethnic singer Pelageya. Anton Belyaev left the show after the semifinal.

In autumn of 2014 Anton Belyaev supported the project of Russian Greenpeace “Million for separate collection” and made an exclusive present to those who speak about waste recycling. The present was the song Stop.Quiet.

In 2015 Anton participated in TV show “Main stage” (“Glavnaya Scena”) on Channel Rossiya-1 as a sound producer in team of Igor Matvienko. He was also a member of jury at qualifying castings.

On January 7, 2015, the film “Voices of a big country” (“Golosa bolshoi strany”) saw the light. Anton Belyaev was a sound producer and composer of the movie.

At the end of 2016 Anton Belyaev created music for immersive play “The Returning” (“Vernuvshiesya”), which saw the light on December 1, 2016, in Moscow. The play was a result of collaboration of directors Viktor Karina and Mia Zanette from New York theatre company Journey Lab and Russian producers Vyacheslav Dusmuhametov and Miguel (choreographer and mentor of TV Show “Dances” (“Tancy”) on TNT Channel).

On February 14, 2018, Russian film “The Ice” premiered. Anton Belyaev was a composer of the film in collaboration with Dmitriy Selipanov. Later the premiere took place in Germany, China and South Korea. For this work Anton and Dmitriy received an award “Golden Eagle Award”.

Advertising campaigns 
In 2019 Anton Belyaev participated in the advertising campaign of UNIQLO, dedicated to a new collection and the launch of an online shop in Russia.

Awards 
Anton Belyaev was nominated for GQ award “Man of the year – 2015” in category “Musician of the year”. In 2016 Anton was included in GQ’s list “50 most stylish men”. And he also became “The most stylish man” according to the award of Fashion TV channel - «Fashion Summer Awards 2016». Anton and Yulia were included in GQ’s list “25 most stylish couples 2017”. In 2018 Anton again was included in GQ’s list “100 most stylish men”.

In 2019 Anton Belyaev and composer Dmitriy Selipanov got the award “The Golden Eagle” for the best music for the film “The Ice”.

References

External links 

 Игорь Григорьев об Антоне Беляеве (основателе Therr Maitz)
 Интервью Антона Беляева для портала Fraufluger
 Антон Беляев на Музофил
 Интервью Антона Беляева (Therr Maitz) для Jazz Parking
 Интервью Антона Беляева для портала vokrug.tv
 Выступление Антона Беляева на «слепых прослушиваниях» проекта Голос 2
 Кузьмина, Юлия. Жизнь без «Голоса» // Vechernyaya Moskva, № 39 (27176), 8—15 октября 2015 г., с. 14.
Интервью Антона Беляева для журнала Esquire, 2018
Эфир с Антоном Беляевым, Екатериной Мцитуридзе и Михаилом Зыгарем на телеканале Дождь "Оскар на Дожде", 2019
 Natalya Sindeyeva. «С одной стороны я понимаю, что это не мое, но с другой стороны, немножко завидую»: Антон Беляев о двояком отношении к Шнурову и группе «Ленинград» // Dozhd

21st-century Russian singers
The Voice (franchise) contestants
1979 births
Living people